The 1996 EA Generali Open was a men's tennis tournament played on outdoor clay courts in Kitzbühel, Austria that was part of the World Series of the 1996 ATP Tour. It was the 41st edition of the tournament and was held from 22 July until 28 July 1996. Fifth-seeded Alberto Berasategui won the singles title.

Finals

Singles

 Alberto Berasategui defeated  Àlex Corretja, 6–2, 6–4, 6–4
 It was Berasategui's 2nd singles title of the year and the 11th of his career.

Doubles

 Libor Pimek /  Byron Talbot defeated  David Adams /  Menno Oosting, 7–6, 6–3

References

External links
 ITF tournament edition details

Generali Open
Austrian Open Kitzbühel
Austrian Open